Ballerina is a 1937 French ballet film directed by Jean Benoît-Lévy and Marie Epstein, starring Yvette Chauviré, Mia Slavenska and Janine Charrat. The original title is La Mort du cygne, the French title for Michel Fokine’s short ballet piece The Dying Swan. It tells the story of a 12-year-old girl who fears that her favourite performer at the Paris Opera Ballet will be replaced by a Russian ballerina, and sets out to engineer an accident for the rival.

The film is based on the 1933 short story "La Mort du cygne" by Paul Morand. The choreography was done by Serge Lifar. The film was remade in the United States as The Unfinished Dance, released in 1947.

Cast
 Yvette Chauviré as Mademoiselle Beaupré
 Mia Slavenska as Nathalie Karine
 André Pernet as Méphiste
 Janine Charrat as Rose Souris
 France Ellys as Madame Souris
 Jean Périer as Le directeur
 Mady Berry as Célestine

Reception
Anna Kisselgoff of The New York Times wrote in 1998: "The hard-nosed American critics raving about the film recognized its special and exquisite quality from the start. Rightly ignoring its surface sentimentality, they were clearly unnerved and impressed by Benoit-Levy's psychological insight into childhood innocence gone awry. Today the film is priceless in its haunting evocation of the Paris Opera on the eve of World War II." Kisselgoff continued: "The title ballet, not to be confused with Fokine's famous solo The Dying Swan, looks downright silly, but elsewhere Lifar's choreography is firmly grounded in the classical idiom. ... Ms. Charrat, as a child performer, and the two ballerinas are extraordinary."

References

1937 films
Films about ballet
Films based on short fiction
Films based on works by Paul Morand
Films set in Paris
French drama films
1930s French-language films
1937 drama films
1930s French films